Château de Renouard is a castle in Le Renouard, Orne, France. It was a castle of the House of Balliol family. The castle was burned in 1119 but was rebuilt later. The castle now operates as a hotel.

References
 Stell, G. P., "Balliol, Bernard de (d. 1154x62)", Oxford Dictionary of National Biography, Oxford University Press, 2004

External links
Hotel website
Chateau History

Châteaux in Orne
House of Balliol